The 2022 FIBA Asia Cup was the 30th edition of the FIBA Asia Cup, the continental basketball championship in Asia. The tournament was organised by FIBA Asia.

Originally intended to be the 2021 edition, the tournament was initially scheduled to take place between 3 and 15 August 2021, but it was postponed due to 17 to 29 August 2021 to avoid scheduling conflict with the 2020 Summer Olympics which was postponed by a year due to the COVID-19 pandemic. It was later postponed again to 12 to 24 July 2022.

Indonesia was the host for second time after staging the 1993 edition. Australia defended their title with a win over Lebanon, while New Zealand grabbed their first medal after winning bronze with a win against Jordan.

Host selection
On 7 October 2020, Indonesian Youth and Sports Minister Zainudin Amali confirmed that FIBA had entrusted Indonesia to host the upcoming Asia Cup in 2021. However, an official announcement by FIBA was yet to be made at that time. On 18 December, FIBA confirmed that the country would host the tournament.

However, due to a surge of COVID-19 cases in Indonesia amid the pandemic as of July 2021, FIBA considered postponing the competition to 2022. Jordan had offered to host the tournament as an alternative.

On 23 July 2021, FIBA announced that the Asia Cup was rescheduled to July 2022.

Venue

Format
16 qualified teams played in the main round. They were divided into four groups of four teams. Every group winner gained direct access to the quarterfinal, while the runners-up played a playoff game.

Qualification

The qualification started on 23 February 2018. Teams that did not manage to advance to the 2019 FIBA Basketball World Cup qualification and the teams that did not participate in it played in the first round of the pre-qualifiers. Pre-qualifiers were held in the western and eastern regions to determine the eight teams who will join the 16 teams that participated in the 2017 FIBA Asia Cup. Below is the list of qualified teams to the 2022 FIBA Asia Cup. Indonesia qualified by virtue of being confirmed as host on 18 December 2020, although they have entered the qualification process prior to the confirmation of their hosting.

Qualified teams

Draw
The draw was scheduled to take place on 8 December 2021, but was postponed due to COVID-19 pandemic-related travel restrictions by Indonesia. The draw took place on 18 February 2022.

Seeding
The seeding was announced on 15 February 2022. Indonesia had the right to choose their group.

Squads

Each team has a roster of twelve players. A team may opt to allocate a roster spot to a naturalized player.

Preliminary round
All times are local (UTC+7).

Group A

Group B

Group C

Group D

Final round

Bracket

Playoffs

Quarterfinals

Semifinals

Third place game

Final

Final standing

Statistics and awards

Statistical leaders

Players

Points

Rebounds

Assists

Blocks

Steals

Efficiency

Teams

Points

Rebounds

Assists

Blocks

Steals

Efficiency

Awards
The awards were announced on 24 July.

See also
 2021 FIBA Women's Asia Cup

References

External links

Tournament summary

 
2021–22 in Asian basketball
2022 in Indonesian sport
FIBA Asia Cup
FIBA Asia Cup
FIBA Asia Cup